Astranthium ciliatum, the Comanche western-daisy, is a North American species of flowering plants in the family Asteraceae. It is native to the southern part of the Great Plains of the central United States, with the range continuing southward into northeastern Mexico. It is found in the States of Nuevo León, Tamaulipas, Texas, Oklahoma, Arkansas, Missouri, and Kansas.

Astranthium ciliatum is an annual with a taproot, and usually an unbranched stem up to 50 cm (20 inches) tall. Flower heads have white or bluish ray florets and yellow disc florets.

References

External links
Southeastern Flora
Craig Fraiser photo,  Blue /Purple Species, Astranthium integrifolium ssp. ciliatum 

Astereae
Flora of the Great Plains (North America)
Plants described in 1837
Flora of Northeastern Mexico